Stein Mansion (Greek: Μέγαρο Στάιν) is the name of a historic building in Eleftherias Square, Thessaloniki, Greece.

Built in 1906, it was the only building of the square not destroyed by the Great Fire of Thessaloniki in 1917. It was designed by architect Eli Ernst Levi for the Austrian clothing retail brand "Stein’s Oriental Stores Ltd", which had also department stores in Egypt.

Later it housed the Hellenic Post Offices, while after WWII it suffered architectural interventions which damaged its initial design.

Gallery

References

Sources
Μέγαρο Στάιν

Buildings and structures in Thessaloniki
Modernist architecture in Greece
1906 architecture
1906 establishments in Greece